Jyeshtharaj Bhalchandra Joshi is an Indian chemical engineer, nuclear scientist, consultant and professor, widely known for his innovations in nuclear reactor designs and generally regarded as a respected teacher. He is the DAE-Homi Bhabha Chair Professor, Homi Bhabha National Institute, Mumbai, and is the recipient of Shantiswarup Bhatnagar Prize for Engineering Sciences and many other awards and recognitions. He received the third highest civilian honour, the Padma Bhushan, in 2014 for his services to the field of chemical engineering and nuclear science.

Biography
Joshi was born on 28 May 1949, in Masur, Satara district, in the Indian state of Maharashtra, as the son of Bhalachandra (Kaka) Joshi. He passed BE in chemical engineering in 1971 and ME in 1972 from the University Department of Chemical Technology (UDCT), Mumbai after which he started his research, under the guidance of renowmed chemical engineer, Man Mohan Sharma. In 1977, he was awarded the PhD.

Joshi lives in Mumbai and is married to Rujuta and the couple has a son, Aniruddha, who is PhD in Computer Science and Engineering from the Indian Institute of Technology, Mumbai.

Career
Joshi started his career, in 1972, as joining the faculty of the erstwhile University Department of Chemical Technology (UDCT), now known as Institute of Chemical Technology, Mumbai. During 1999 to 2000, as the director of ICT, he organised around 200 science workshops. He was also successful in upgrading the Institute to the status of a deemed university and increases fundraising for the Institute research by way of donations, research contracts and project consultancies. Joshi worked there for the most part of his career, in various positions and retired as its Director in 2009.

After that he joined as a Homi Bhabha Chair Professor in Homi Bhabha National Institute, Department of Atomic Energy, Mumbai. Presently, he is working as emeritus professor in Department of Atomic Energy, Mumbai.

Positions held
Apart from the academic positions, Joshi has worked on the editorial or advisory board of many known and peer reviewed scientific journals.
 Chemical Engineering Science Journal
 Chemical Engineering Research and Design Journal
 Reviews in Chemical Engineering
 Canadian Journal of Chemical Engineering

Research and teaching

Scientific Focus
Joshi is credited with many innovative designs in the area of multiphase reactors. He is reported to have successfully developed multiphase sparged and mechanically agitated reactors. This has helped in the set up of large number of commercial size reactors in India and abroad. Joshi published over 442 scientific papers he has published in peer reviewed journals, with over 10772 citations on Google Scholar. Chem Tech Journal USA has recommended his procedures five times. 

Some of his notable scientific works are:
 Development of inhouse codes for computational fluid dynamics (CFD) for multiphase dispersions and complex geometries.
 Performed the first Laser-Doppler anemometer (LDA) measurements in multiphase dispersions.
 Development of an algorithm for the prediction of fractional gas hold-up and bubble size distribution.
 Deployment of the PIV technique to shadography for measuring motion of dispersed phases (bubbles, drops and particles).
 Development of a methodology for estimating detailed knowledge of the entire range of length, velocity and energy scales of turbulent structures in large number of Chemical Process Equipment.
 Development of a relationship between the mean and turbulent flow patterns and the design parameters such as axial mixing, mixing time, heat and mass transfer coefficients.
 Analysis of the multiphase reaction viz. absorption of nitrogen oxides (NOx) in water, alkaline and acidic solutions.
 Development of new designs for household cooker and stoves with thermal efficiencies of 50 to 60%, an improvement on the conventional cookers which have a thermal efficiency of 12 to 20%. He has released these technologies on a commercial basis.

Teaching work
Joshi is widely respected as a mentor-teacher; he has successfully guided 91 doctoral and 60 masters students and has supervised 20 post doctoral students.

Awards and recognitions
Joshi has been honoured, both academically and socially, by several prominent institutions.

Social recognitions
 Padma Bhushan
 Shantiswarup Bhatnagar Prize for Engineering Sciences – 1991
 Amar-Dye-Chem Award for Excellence in Research and Development – Indian Institute of Chemical Engineers – 1983
 Herdillia Award – 1989
 Vaswik Award – 1992
 Dr KG Naik Gold Medal – 1995
 Chemtech Foundation Award – 1997
 Goyal Foundation Award – 1998
 Dr. Anji Reddy Innovation Award – 2005
 Indian Institute of Chemical Engineers Award – 2007

Academic recognitions
 DAE-Homi Bhabha Chair Professor, Homi Bhabha National Institute, Mumbai
 J. C. Bose Fellow in the Institute of Chemical Technology, Mumbai
 Fellow of Indian National Science Academy (FNA)
 Fellow of Academy for the Developing World (TWAS)
 INSA Medal for Young Scientist – 1981
 Fellowship of Indian Academy of Sciences, Bangalore – 1991
 Diamond Award of UDCT – 1994
 Viswakarma Medal of INSA – 2000
 Zyed Hussain Zaheer Medal of INSA – 2008
 Elected to the National Academy of Engineering – 2021 (for contributions in rational design of multiphase chemical process equipment and leadership in shaping the Indian chemical industry.

See also
 Man Mohan Sharma

External links
 Profile written by Man Mohan Sharma, Emeritus Professor of Eminence, Institute of Chemical Technology, Mumbai, India and former Director, of UDCT.

References

1949 births
Living people
Recipients of the Padma Bhushan in science & engineering
Indian scientific authors
Chemical engineering academics
Scientists from Maharashtra
Indian fluid dynamicists
20th-century Indian chemists
Recipients of the Shanti Swarup Bhatnagar Award in Engineering Science
Institute of Chemical Technology alumni